"Jumpin" is a song by American rapper NLE Choppa, featuring vocals from fellow American rapper Polo G. It was released by Warner Records on November 5, 2021, as the third single from NLE Choppa's second studio album, Me vs. Me. The song was written by NLE Choppa, Polo G, CashMoneyAP, YoungKio, Carlos Muñoz, Carter Lang and Dylan de Graaff. It was produced by CashMoneyAP, YoungKio, Loshendrix, Daniel Moras, and Yume, while it was co-produced by Carter Lang and Jordan Waré.

Background and composition
NLE Choppa announced the release of the single on October 29, 2021, exactly one week before its release. "Jumpin" has been described as "a stuttering crime-life stomper" with a "strong" chorus from NLE Choppa and "a cool forbidding melodic intensity" on Polo G's verse.

Music video
A music video premiered alongside the release of the song on November 5, 2021. The video sees NLE Choppa and Polo G wearing ski masks and holding guns. They rob a bank and subsequently get caught by police. However, both artists escape with the money they stole. NLE Choppa ends up showing his group, which includes Polo G, six steps to do in order to commit the crime.

Credits and personnel
Credits adapted from Tidal.

 NLE Choppa – lead vocals, songwriting
 Polo G – featured vocals, songwriting
 CashMoneyAP – production, songwriting
 YoungKio – production, songwriting
 Loshendrix – production, songwriting
 Daniel Moras – production, songwriting
 Yume – production, songwriting
 Carter Lang – co-production, songwriting
 Jordan Waré – co-production, songwriting
 Kaniel the One – songwriting
 Damico – songwriting
 Urstrulyxyz – songwriting
 Clibbo – songwriting
 Aaron Mattes – mixing, recording
 Tiernan Cranny – mixing assistance
 Chris Athens – mastering
 Dave Huffman – mastering assistance
 Harrison Holmes – mastering assistance

Charts

Certifications

References

2021 singles
2021 songs
NLE Choppa songs
Polo G songs
Songs written by Polo G
Songs written by CashMoneyAP
Songs written by NLE Choppa